David Holmes (born 1981) is a British podcast host and former actor and stunt performer.

Career
Holmes was the stunt double for Daniel Radcliffe as Harry Potter in the first six films of the Harry Potter film series. He played a Slytherin beater in Harry Potter and the Philosopher's Stone, but an error in the film's credits lists him as playing the character Adrian Pucey instead; that role was actually played by Scott Fern.

While test filming for Harry Potter and the Deathly Hallows in January 2009, Holmes injured his spine in an accident during one of the stunts. Although he initially hoped to return to work, Holmes is now paralysed and uses a wheelchair. He is credited in the finished film as a stunt performer.

After becoming disabled, he took up automobile racing, driving a car with hand controls which he could operate. With two friends – also paralysed – Holmes started Ripple Productions, which in 2020 launched a podcast with Daniel Radcliffe, called Cunning Stunts, interviewing other stunt actors to raise awareness about the risks they face.

Filmography

Stunts

Acting

References

External links 
 

1981 births
British male film actors
British stunt performers
Living people
British people with disabilities